Pramod Kumar Mishra (born 11 August 1948), often abbreviated P. K. Mishra, is the 13th and current principal secretary to the Prime Minister of India, Narendra Modi. He is a 1972 batch Indian Administrative Service officer belonging to Gujarat cadre. During 2001–2004, Mishra has also served as the principal secretary to Narendra Modi, when he was the Chief Minister of Gujarat.

Education 
He did his M.A. in economics with a first class at the Delhi School of Economics in 1972. He later did an M.A. in Development economics in 1990 and a Ph.D in Economics/Development Studies from the University of Sussex.

Career 
On 11 September 2019, he was appointed as the principal secretary of the Prime Minister of India. Apart from serving as the Additional Principal Secretary in the Prime Minister's Office, Mishra has served in various key positions for both Indian and Gujarat governments, such as the Additional Chief Secretary (Revenue), Principal Secretary (Agriculture and Cooperation), Principal Secretary to the Chief Minister of Gujarat, member of the Gujarat Electricity Board, and as the district magistrate and collector of Mehsana and Banaskantha districts in the Government of Gujarat, and as the Union Agriculture Secretary, special secretary in Ministry of Home Affairs, additional secretary in Ministry of Urban Development, and as the member secretary of National Capital Region Planning Board in the Government of India.

After his retirement from the Indian Administrative Service, Mishra was appointed the chairman of Gujarat Electricity Regulatory Commission by the Chief Minister of Gujarat. His term as the chairman of commission came to an end on 11 August 2013, when he attained the age of 65.

Principal Secretary to the Prime Minister 

After the election of Narendra Modi as the Prime Minister of India, Mishra was appointed as the Additional Principal Secretary to the Prime Minister of India, in the rank and status of Cabinet Minister, the Government of India's topmost bureaucrat, and was deemed to have been re-employed into the IAS.

During his tenure as additional principal secretary, Mishra has been considered to be one of the best bureaucrats in India.

On 11 June 2019, Mishra was re-appointed as Additional Principal Secretary to Prime Minister Narendra Modi. The Appointments Committee of the Cabinet approved his appointment along with the re-appointment of Principal Secretary Nripendra Misra with effect from 31 May 2019. These appointments were designated to be co-terminus with the term of the Prime Minister.
On 11 September 2019 PK Mishra was appointed as a principal secretary of Prime Minister of India.

Awards
 United Nations Office for Disaster Risk Reduction (UNDRR) on 17 May 2019 conferred the Sasakawa Award 2019 for Disaster Risk Reduction.

References

External links 

 Executive record sheet as maintained by the Department of Personnel and Training of Government of India

Indian Administrative Service officers
Living people
Prime Minister's Office (India)
1948 births
People from Odisha
Principal Secretary to the Prime Minister of India